The 2021 Heilbronner Neckarcup was a professional tennis tournament played on clay courts. It was the seventh edition of the tournament which was part of the 2021 ATP Challenger Tour. It took place in Heilbronn, Germany between 10 and 16 May 2021.

Champions

Singles

 Bernabé Zapata Miralles def.  Daniel Elahi Galán 6–3, 6–4.

Doubles

 Nathaniel Lammons /  Jackson Withrow def.  André Göransson /  Sem Verbeek 6–7(4–7), 6–4, [10–8].

Singles main-draw entrants

Seeds

 1 Rankings are as of 3 May 2021.

Other entrants
The following players received wildcards into the singles main draw:
  Yannick Hanfmann
  Yannick Maden
  Rudolf Molleker

The following player received entry into the singles main draw using a protected ranking:
  Andrey Kuznetsov

The following players received entry into the singles main draw as alternates:
  Kimmer Coppejans
  Alessandro Giannessi

The following players received entry from the qualifying draw:
  Maxime Janvier
  Ergi Kırkın
  Mats Moraing
  Aleksandar Vukic

The following players received entry as lucky losers:
  Tomás Martín Etcheverry
  João Menezes

References

External links
Official Website

2021 ATP Challenger Tour
2021
2021 in German tennis
May 2021 sports events in Germany